United Nations Security Council resolution 2532 was adopted on 1 July 2020. The resolution is a response to United Nations Secretary-General António Manuel de Oliveira Guterres' 'Appeal for Global Ceasefire' of Monday, 23 March 2020, and, as the first global ceasefire, is part of the United Nations' response to the COVID-19 pandemic.

The resolution demands "a general and immediate cessation of hostilities in all situations on its agenda" (i.e., those already identified by the United Nations Security Council (UNSC)); calls for all  parties  engaged in armed  conflicts  (i.e., including those not specifically on the UNSC agenda) to "engage immediately in a durable humanitarian pause for at least 90 consecutive days"; specifically excludes UNSC designated terrorist groups, e.g., the Islamic State in Iraq and the Levant; requests that the UN Secretary-General accelerates the international response to the coronavirus pandemic, requests that the Secretary-General regularly updates the UNSC, requests that the Secretary-General instructs peace-keeping operations to provide support and maintain continuity of operations, acknowledges the critical role of women in COVID-19 response efforts and the severe effect on the vulnerable, and decides to maintain oversight.

See also 

 Global ceasefire
 List of United Nations Security Council Resolutions 2501 to 2600 (2019–2021)
 United Nations response to the COVID-19 pandemic

References

External links 
 
 Text of the Resolution at undocs.org

July 2020 events
 2532